Gaładuś is a ribbon lake located in the Suwałki Region, where it is the second largest lake by area. The lake is located in the north-east of Poland and the south of Lithuania. The lake is located in the Gmina Sejny, Podlaskie Voivodeship in Poland, and in the region of Lazdijai in Lithuania. The lake has high and non-forested banks. The lake and its catchment area is found in the drainage basin of the Neman, in the watershed of the Biała Hańcza (Baltoji Ančia).

References

Lakes of Poland
Lakes of Podlaskie Voivodeship
Lakes of Lithuania
International lakes of Europe
Lithuania–Poland border